Viktor Skomorokha is a Ukrainian lawyer and former chairman of the Constitutional Court of Ukraine. He became better known for chairing the Constitutional Court when it lifted a ban of the Communist Party of Ukraine.

Skomorokha is from Dnipropetrovsk Oblast. His working career he started at the Zhovtneva Revolyutsiya (October Revolution) kolkhoz in village of Promin. After his obligatory military service Skomorokha enrolled to the Kharkiv Law Institute. He graduated Yaroslav Mudryi National Law University (Kharkiv Law Institute) in 1967 and after a brief internship-like training, until 1969 Skomorokha was a people's judge at the Krasnyi Luch city court.

In 1969 to 1976 Skomorokha worked as a judge at the Luhansk Oblast court. In 1976-1996 he was a judge of the Supreme Court of Ukraine (judicial college on criminal matters). In 1996-2005 he was a judge of the Constitutional Court of Ukraine. In 1999 at the presidential inauguration Skomorokha was administering an oath from the President of Ukraine Leonid Kuchma.

References

External links
 Viktor Skomorokha. Constitutional Court of Ukraine website.
 Viktor Skomorokha at the Official Ukraine Today

1941 births
Living people
People from Dnipropetrovsk Oblast
Yaroslav Mudryi National Law University alumni
Ukrainian judges
Constitutional Court of Ukraine judges
Judges of the Supreme Court of Ukraine
Ukrainian presidential inaugurations